Low fantasy, or intrusion fantasy, is a subgenre of fantasy fiction in which magical events intrude on an otherwise-normal world. The term thus contrasts with high fantasy stories, which take place in fictional worlds that have their own sets of rules and physical laws.

Intrusion fantasy places less emphasis on elements typically associated with fantasy and sets a narrative in realistic environments with elements of the fantastical. Sometimes, there are just enough fantastical elements to make ambiguous the boundary between what is real and what is purely psychological or supernatural. The word "low" refers to the prominence of traditional fantasy elements within the work and is not a remark on the work's overall quality.

An alternative definition, common in role-playing games, rests on the story and characters being more realistic and less mythic in scope. Thus, some works like Robert E. Howard's Conan the Barbarian series can be high fantasy according to the first definition but low fantasy according to the second. With other works, such as the TV series Supernatural, the opposite is true.

History
Fantasy fiction developed out of fairy tales in the nineteenth century.  Early nineteenth century scholarship in folklore led to fantasy fiction dominating Victorian children's literature.  The genre diverged into the two subgenres, high and low fantasy, after the Edwardian era.  Low fantasy itself diverged into further subgenres in the twentieth century.
The forms of low fantasy include personified animals, personified toys (including The Indian in the Cupboard and The Doll's House; building on the earlier The Adventures of Pinocchio), comic fantasies of exaggerated character traits and altered physics (including Pippi Longstocking and The Borrowers), magical powers, supernatural elements and time slips.

French fantastic fiction is predominantly within the low fantasy genre.  Low fantasy corresponds to the French genre of "le fantastique" but French literature has no tradition equivalent to English literature's high fantasy. According to David Ketterer, emeritus professor of English at Concordia University, Montreal, the French term Le fantastique "refers to a specific kind of fantasy, that in which the supernatural or the bizarre intrudes into the everyday world; the closest equivalents in English would be 'low fantasy', 'dark fantasy' or 'weird fiction'.  'Le fantastique' does not cover the kind of complete secondary world creation typified by Tolkien's Lord of the Rings.  There is no tradition of "dragons and wizards" fantasy in French." Where high fantasy does occur, the terms "le merveilleux" or "le fantastique moderne" are often used.

Critical interpretations
The fiction gives the author greater agency than allowed in the real world.  Since being popularised in the works of E. Nesbit, the "low/portal variety" of fantasy has become a staple for its facility in challenging "established orders of society and thought."  Children usually read more low fantasy than high fantasy.

The early 21st century is seeing an increase in prominence of the work of authors such as George R. R. Martin and Joe Abercrombie, whose high fantasy novels (works set entirely in fantasy worlds) have been referred to as "low fantasy" because they de-emphasize magic and non-human intelligent races in favor of a more cynical portrayal of human conflict.  Fantasy writer David Chandler considered this "rise of 'Low Fantasy'" to reflect the contemporary reality of the War on Terror—characterized by "secret deals", "vicious reprisals" and "sudden acts of terrifying carnage"—much as the horror genre reacted to the Vietnam War a generation earlier.

Distinguishing between subgenres
High and low fantasy are distinguished as being set, respectively, in an alternative "secondary" world or in the real "primary" world.  In many works, the distinction between primary or secondary world settings, and therefore whether it is low or high fantasy, can be unclear.  The secondary world may take three forms, described by Nikki Gamble in her explication of three characteristics of high fantasy:
 Primary does not exist (e.g., Dungeons & Dragons) or is irrelevant (e.g., Discworld)
 Entered through a portal from the primary world (e.g., Alice's Adventures in Wonderland, The Chronicles of Narnia, His Dark Materials, and The Dark Tower)
 World-within-a-world (e.g., American Gods, The Gods of Pegāna, The Magicians, and Harry Potter)

A few high fantasy series do not easily fit into Gamble's categories. For example, J. R. R. Tolkien's The Lord of the Rings is set in the primary world of Earth in the ancient past, and Tolkien adamantly disagreed with anyone who thought otherwise. According to Tolkien, he had set it in the inhabited lands of geographically north-west Europe. Tolkien himself disagreed with the notion that his stories diverged from reality, but rather defended his position that the "essentials of that abiding place are all there (at any rate for inhabitants of N.W. Europe), so naturally it feels familiar, even if a little glorified by enchantment of distance in time." Nevertheless, Middle-earth is sufficiently divergent from reality to be classed as a secondary world and hence high fantasy. J. K. Rowling's Harry Potter series is again set in the real world; however, while the primary setting, mostly the school, Hogwarts, is said to be located somewhere in Scotland, it is physically separated from the real world and becomes a "world-within-a-world". Similarly, Philip Pullman's His Dark Materials is largely set in an alternate Oxfordshire, a real location, but the fact that it is an alternate world at all places it in the high fantasy subgenre.

Some sources place Harry Potter and His Dark Materials in the low fantasy genre.  Karin E. Westman, writing in The Oxford Handbook of Children's Literature states that because "[J. K.] Rowling is much more interested in how fantasy provides perspective on everyday experience and the individual's place in society," and her inclusion of bildungsroman (a coming-of-age story) and the school story genres, "align her primarily with the domestic (or low) fantasy of authors such as E. Nesbit, Elizabeth Goudge, and Paul Gallico...as well as authors like Philip Pullman and Jonathan Stroud, who are also interested in the intersection of the personal and the political within quotidian experiences."

Low fantasy is related to a number of other genres or subgenres.
 Urban fantasy takes place in a modern urban as opposed to rural or historical setting, and thus can be viewed as a type of low fantasy.
 Dark fantasy uses fantasy to create a sense of horror or dread. Since it often has a real-world setting, there is an overlap with low fantasy.
 Paranormal romance, of which the best-known variety is the vampire romance, is nearly always low fantasy.
 Superhero fiction may count as low fantasy if the hero's powers have a supernatural rather than a scientific (or pseudoscientific) explanation.
 Magical realism has a largely realistic view of the world but introduces supernatural elements. While authors such as Gene Wolfe and Terry Pratchett regard it as fantasy, it has been claimed as a different genre on the grounds that in magical realism the supernatural events are usually included in the worldview of the human characters while in low fantasy they usually violate it.

Role-playing games
For their own purposes role-playing games sometimes use a different definition of low fantasy.  GURPS Fantasy defines the genre as "closer to realistic fiction than to myth.  Low Fantasy stories focus on people's daily lives and practical goals ... A Low Fantasy campaign asks what it's like to live in a world of monsters, magic, and demigods."  The book acknowledges the literary definition of the genre with "some critics define 'low fantasy' as any fantasy story set in the real world.  However, a real world setting can include the kind of mythic elements this book classifies as high fantasy."

Examples

 The Borrowers by Mary Norton
 The Dark Is Rising by Susan Cooper
 The Doll's House by Rumer Godden
 Five Children and It by E. Nesbit
 Good Omens by Neil Gaiman and Terry Pratchett
 The Indian in the Cupboard by Lynne Reid Banks
 The Snow Spider by Jenny Nimmo
 That Hideous Strength by C. S. Lewis
 Tuck Everlasting by Natalie Babbitt

See also
 Contemporary fantasy
 Occult detective fiction
 Magic realism
 Urban fantasy
 Dark fantasy
 Paranormal romance

Explanatory notes

References

 
 
Fantasy genres